The Great Northern Railway Class H4 (classified K3 by the LNER) was a class of 2-6-0 steam locomotive designed for mixed-traffic work.

The type was a more powerful development of the earlier H3 (LNER K2) class and was notable at the time, as the  boilers were the largest fitted to any British locomotive to that date. After formation of the London and North Eastern Railway, the type became known as class K3 and was adopted as an LNER standard design. They got the nickname "Jazzers" after the rhythm of their exhaust beat and the unbalanced gyratory movement.

Construction

The first ten locomotives were built at the GNR's Doncaster Works in 1920, to the design of Nigel Gresley.  Six further batches were built at Doncaster and Darlington Works, Armstrong Whitworth, Robert Stephenson and Company and the North British Locomotive Company. The last few of 193 examples were delivered in 1937.

Use
They were excellent mixed-traffic locomotives, although their large size restricted their route availability. In their latter years they were primarily employed on vacuum-fitted freight traffic.

Accidents and incidents

Fourteen people were killed and 29 were injured.
On 25 August 1956, locomotive No. 61846 was hauling an empty stock train which ran away and crashed through the buffers at  station, Yorkshire. The accident was due to the failure to connect the brake pipe between the train and locomotive.

Class K5
In 1945, Edward Thompson rebuilt K3 No. 206 into a two-cylinder engine forming the LNER Class K5. No more were so treated, although some later received K5 type boilers.

Numbering
The original ten locomotives were numbered 1000–1009 by the GNR, and became LNER 4000–4009. Those built for the LNER were numbered haphazardly, filling in gaps in the LNER's numbering scheme. In the LNER's 1946 renumbering programme, the K3s and K5 were renumbered 1800–1992, and they later became British Railways 61800–61992.

Withdrawal
All were withdrawn and scrapped between 1959 and 1962; the K5 went in 1960. None have survived into preservation. Three were kept as stationary boilers until 1965.

Possible Future Revival
None of the original K3's were preserved; however, it was announced in September 2018 that following on from the LNER Class V4 no 3403 & LNER Class V3 projects where new engines are planned to be built. A new K3 is to be built after these are completed. The number of the engine has not yet been confirmed, but is expected to be a replica of an original engine since the number 61993 was allocated to the LNER Class K4's.

References 

Sources

External links 

 LNER encyclopedia

H4
2-6-0 locomotives
Armstrong Whitworth locomotives
Robert Stephenson and Company locomotives
NBL locomotives
Railway locomotives introduced in 1920
Scrapped locomotives
Standard gauge steam locomotives of Great Britain